Arsenio Hilario Sison Lacson Sr. (December 26, 1912 – April 15, 1962) was a Filipino journalist and politician who gained widespread attention as 1st to be elected and 17th Mayor of Manila from 1952 to 1962. An active executive likened by Time and The New York Times to New York City's Fiorello La Guardia, he was the first Manila mayor to be reelected to three terms. Nicknamed "Arsenic" and described as "a good man with a bad mouth", Lacson's fiery temperament became a trademark of his political and broadcasting career. He died suddenly from a stroke amidst talk that he was planning to run in the 1965 presidential election.

Early life
Lacson was born on December 26, 1912 in Talisay, Negros Occidental to Roman Ledesma Lacson, and his wife Rosario Sison, during a stormy December day.He was named after Philippine showman and journalist Arsenio Luz, whom his father greatly admired, and his grandfather Hilario Lacson. He was related to Aniceto Lacson, the president of the short-lived Republic of Negros. His niece, Rose, would later gain prominence as a controversial socialite in Australia.

A sickly lad, Lacson turned to athletics while a student at the Ateneo de Manila University, where he would obtain his Bachelor of Arts degree. He pursued Ateneo since majority of his relatives had either studied or presently studying in that educational institution. His father knew that should his son enter Ateneo, he is very sure that it was a center, and a good nurturer of, the spiritual life.

He became an amateur boxer while a student, accounting for his broken nose that later became a prominent feature of his profile.

Lacson studied law at the University of Santo Tomas. After graduating and passing the bar examinations in 1937, he joined the law office of future Senator Vicente Francisco, and later, the Department of Justice as an assistant attorney. Lacson also worked as a sportswriter before the outbreak of World War II.

Sporting career

Football
Lacson was part of the collegiate team of the Ateneo de Manila University. He played at the halfback position. He was also part of the Philippine national football team and participated in tournaments such as the 1934 Far Eastern Championship Games.

World War II guerrilla

Lacson joined the armed resistance against the Japanese military which had invaded the Philippines in late 1941. He joined the Free Philippines underground movement, and acted as a lead scout during the Battle of Manila. Lacson also fought in the battle for the liberation of Baguio on April 26, 1945.

For his service during the war, Lacson received citations from the Veterans of Foreign Wars and the Sixth United States Army. Years later, when asked by Japanese Prime Minister Nobusuke Kishi if he had learned Japanese during the war, Lacson responded, "I was too busy shooting at Japanese to learn any."

Journalism career
Lacson resumed his career in journalism after the war. He also had his own radio program called In This Corner, where he delivered social and political commentary. Lacson became popular as a result of his radio show, but also earned the ire of President Manuel Roxas, whom he nicknamed "Manny the Weep". In 1947, President Roxas ordered Lacson's suspension from the airwaves. The incident drew international attention after former United States Interior Secretary Harold L. Ickes defended Roxas's action and in turn drew rebuke for such defense from the popular radio commentator Walter Winchell. During the post-war Lacson also wrote columns together with editor Jose Diokno, and writers Teodoro Locsin Sr., and Phillip Buencamino in a newspaper they founded called the Free Philippines Newspaper.

Political career

House of Representatives
In the 1949 general elections, Lacson ran for and won a seat in the House of Representatives, representing the 2nd District of Manila, which then consisted of the districts of Binondo, Quiapo, San Nicolas and Santa Cruz. He was elected under the banner of the Nacionalista Party. During the two years he served in the House, Lacson was cited by the media assigned to cover Congress as among the "10 Most Useful Congressmen" for "his excellent display as a fiscalizer and a lawmaker".

Mayor of Manila
It was only in 1951 that the office of Manila mayor became an elective position, following the amendment of its city charter. Representative Lacson successfully unseated incumbent Manila Mayor Manuel de la Fuente in the first ever mayoralty election in the city. He assumed the office of mayor on January 1, 1952, thus giving up his seat in the Congress. He was re-elected in 1955 and 1959. He immediately became known as a tough-minded reformist mayor, and in the 1950s, he and Zamboanga City Mayor Cesar Climaco were touted as exemplars of good local governance. Climaco, in fact, was praised as "The Arsenio Lacson of the South".

By that time, Lacson claimed that the income earned by Manila for the Philippines supported 70% of the salaries of the national government officials and members of Congress, as well as 70% of the expenses of the Armed Forces of the Philippines.

Lacson embarked on crusades to maintain peace and order and good government in Manila. He fired 600 city employees for incompetence, and dismissed corrupt policemen. He personally led raids on brothels masquerading as massage parlors and on unauthorized market vendors. Lacson ordered bulldozers to clear a squatter colony in Malate that had stood since shortly after the war. Lacson established a mobile 60-car patrol unit that patrolled the city at all hours, and he himself would patrol the city at nights in a black police car. Lacson also established the Manila Zoo and the first city underpass, located in Quiapo, posthumously named after him.

Throughout his ten years as mayor, Lacson maintained his radio program, which now aired over DZBB and would also later be broadcast on television. The broadcasts were pre-recorded in order to edit out his expletives and occasional foul language. He spoke out on air on national and international issues, and responded to critics who suggested that he confine himself to local Manila issues that he did not lose his right as a citizen to speak out on public affairs upon his election as mayor. He was a fervent critic of President Elpidio Quirino of the Liberal Party. In 1952, upon the filing of a criminal libel complaint against Lacson by a judge whom he criticized on his radio show, Quirino suspended Lacson from office. Lacson remained suspended for 73 days until the Supreme Court voided the suspension order.

Though the hard-drinking, gun-toting Lacson projected an image of machismo, the author Nick Joaquin observed:

Peak years

In 1953, Lacson actively campaigned for Nacionalista presidential candidate Ramon Magsaysay, who would go on to defeat the incumbent Quirino. After President Magsaysay's death in a plane crash months before the 1957 presidential election, Lacson claimed that Magsaysay had offered to name him as the Nacionalista candidate for vice president, in lieu of incumbent Vice-President Carlos P. Garcia. According to Lacson, he declined the offer, telling Magsaysay "the time has not yet come".

Nonetheless, after Magsaysay's death, Lacson turned against the newly installed President Garcia, and considered running against Garcia in the 1957 election. In April 1957, Lacson went on a national tour in order to gauge his nationwide strength as a presidential candidate. While the tour indicated considerable popularity of Lacson in the provinces, his potential run was hampered by a lack of funding and a party machinery. It was believed that Lacson would have easily won the presidency in 1957 had he obtained the nomination of either his Nacionalista Party, then committed to Garcia, or the rival Liberal Party, which would select Jose Yulo as its candidate. The American expatriate and tobacco industrialist Harry Stonehill, who was later indicted by Justice Secretary Jose W. Diokno for bribing officials, falsely claimed that Lacson had asked him to finance his campaign against Garcia. When Stonehill refused, Lacson decided not to run, and thereafter, staged a rally at Plaza Miranda where he denounced the United States and what he perceived as the subservience of the Philippine government to the Americans. In his career, Lacson was frequently tagged as anti-American, and he had criticized the United States for having no foreign policy "but just a pathological fear of communism".

Meteoric rise and proposed presidential campaign with Jose W. Diokno
Garcia won in the 1957 election, and Lacson became a persistent critic of the President throughout his four-year term. In 1961, Lacson turned against the Nacionalista Party and supported the presidential candidacy of Vice-President Diosdado Macapagal of the Liberal Party. He was named Macapagal's national campaign manager and was attributed as "the moving spirit behind a nationwide drive that led to Macapagal's victory at the polls". Not long after Macapagal's election, Lacson returned to the Nacionalista Party and became increasingly critical of the President, explaining "I only promised to make Macapagal President, not agree with him forever." Lacson was considered as the likely presidential candidate of the Nacionalistas for the 1965 election, with his close friend attorney Jose W. Diokno as his intended running mate. Before becoming the justice secretary through Lacson's endorsement, Atty. Diokno previously defended the mayor and radio personality for libel charges against his talk show. Lacson would in turn often visit Diokno's Parañaque home in the wee hours to make breakfast for Diokno and his wife Carmen. The lawyer and future senator often volunteered to edit Mayor Lacson's newspaper articles. Lacson garnered a huge level of fame that would have allowed him to win as president in the 1965 election. Unfortunately tragedy struck when Mayor Lacson suddenly died, allowing the party to select Ferdinand Marcos, an Ilocano politician who left the Liberal Party to give him an opportunity to run against partymate Macapagal.

Death 
As mayor, Lacson had faced several attempts on his life. He twice disarmed gunmen who had attacked him, and survived an ambush as he was driving home one night. Around 5:40 P.M. of August 15, 1962, a hotel boy named Pablo Olazo, who was asked by Lacson to get him some ice, saw him almost at the end of his bed and he was profusely perspiring. Olazo, then fetched for the aides of Lacson, and later called Mario Tintiangco, his personal physician, but it was Godofredo Banzon, who was the first doctor arrived around 5:50 in the afternoon. Around fifteen minutes later, Banzon pronounced Lacson dead. By that time, a secondary physician named Baltazar Villaraza arrived, and he and Banzon thought that the cause of Lacson's death was coronary thrombosis. Yet it would be a stroke that ended Lacson's life at the age of 49. Some sources claim that he was fatally stricken at a hotel suite while in the company of Charito Solis, but the records show that he was alone in his hotel room and did not log the name of Solis. Lacson was buried at the Manila North Cemetery. His official death caused by heart problems, surprised his remaining family members since they insisted that Lacson, a short time before his eventual demise, had underwent a routine medical check-up and the results showed that his heart was in perfect condition.

Personal life
Lacson was married to Luz Santiago and has 4 children.

Legacy 

Numerous honors have been bestowed since the Mayor's passing. Places named after Lacson include the Lacson Underpass in Quiapo, while Plaza Goiti in Santa Cruz renamed into "Plaza Lacson", and Governor Forbes Avenue in Sampaloc and Santa Cruz was renamed into "Lacson Avenue". In Plaza Lacson is one of Lacson's statues; another statue was erected along Roxas Boulevard facing Manila Bay, this time of Lacson seated on a bench reading a newspaper, as he was a renowned journalist and reporter. Mayor Lacson was later honored with a statue outside the Manila City Hall as one of the finest statesmen in history.

Notes

References

 
 

|-

1912 births
1962 deaths
Ateneo de Manila University alumni
Filipino radio journalists
Paramilitary Filipinos
People from Negros Occidental
University of Santo Tomas alumni
Mayors of Manila
Nacionalista Party politicians
Members of the House of Representatives of the Philippines from Manila
20th-century Filipino lawyers
Burials at the Manila North Cemetery
Philippines international footballers
Association football midfielders